There are two languages called Aja:
Aja language (Niger-Congo), part of the Gbe dialect continuum, spoken in Benin and Togo
Aja language (Nilo-Saharan), spoken in South Sudan

See also
Aja (disambiguation)